María Rosa de Madariaga Álvarez-Prida (9 February 1937 – 29 June 2022) was a Spanish historian.

References

1937 births
2022 deaths
20th-century Spanish historians
21st-century Spanish historians
People from Madrid
Spanish women historians